Bernard Julius Otto Kuehn (sometimes referred to as Kuhn) and his family were spies in the employ of the Abwehr for Nazi Germany who had close ties to Propaganda Minister Joseph Goebbels. In 1935, Goebbels offered Kuehn a job working for Japanese intelligence in Hawaii; he accepted and moved his family to Honolulu on August 15, 1935. The family included Dr. Kuhn, 41 years old; his wife, Friedel; a daughter, Susie Ruth (at 17, she was the former mistress of Goebbels); and her half-brother, Hans Joachim. Since all four members of the family were involved in the espionage they were dubbed the "8 eyed spy".

His daughter dated U.S. military personnel and opened a beauty parlor that offered the best and cheapest services in the city. Wives of high-ranking military personnel would spend hours gossiping about the comings and goings of their husbands and boyfriends. "They talked so much," she would later say, "that it was a relief when they left the place".

Bernard Kuehn's son, Hans Joachim Kuehn was only 11 years old when he was trained by his father to ask precise questions about the ships and submarines. Young Hans was also trained to notice some critical areas on those ships and submarines. Every morning, Bernard would dress up young Hans as a U.S. Navy sailor to show their patriotism, and they would both go walk along the waterfront. The Officers would invite Hans into the ships and submarines and that is when Hans would start spying.

His wife's job was to record all intelligence that the family obtained.

When Japanese master spy Takeo Yoshikawa arrived in Honolulu, Dr. Kuhn would flash coded messages from the attic of the Kuhn household—a system that went undetected until the end.

Bernard Kuehn would send coded messages to Japanese consulates. A Japanese agent claimed that Bernard lacked spying skill and was not made for the job offered by Goebbels. He would engage in his spying activities even when he was at risk of getting caught. The information that Kuehn gave the Japanese was not of great value.

The day of the attack, December 7, 1941, while the Kuehns were watching the carnage, they were still sending coded information to the Japanese army from their cottage that overlooked Pearl Harbor. Although the information sent to Japan were not very valuable, the Kuehns went unnoticed by the Americans until the day of the attack. While still sending the messages, there was a flashing light that was showing from the Kuehn's lodge. This triggered an alert in the eyes of the military intelligence.

The family lived the good life on Japanese pay, but Bernard Kuehn soon came to the attention of the FBI as a possible suspect because of his Nazi connections and lack of any source of income. After the Attack on Pearl Harbor, he was arrested and on February 21, 1942, he was sentenced by a military commission to be shot "by musketry" as a spy.

After volunteering valuable information about the Japanese and German spy networks, his sentence was commuted to 50 years hard labor, but after the war he was deported to Germany. His daughter and wife also served time in prison and both went back to Germany on their release.

Dr. Bernhard L. Hormann, the head of the sociology department at the University of Hawaii, kept a collection of the Kuehn family papers including the correspondences they wrote to one another during and after their internment on Sand Island (Hawaiian Island Detention Camp). Dr. Hormann's family provided a home for Hans Joachim Kuehn during his parents' incarceration and subsequent sentence. His entire collection was donated to the university archives.

References

External links
 FBI file on Bernard Julius Otto Kuehn at vault.fbi.gov

World War II spies for Japan
Attack on Pearl Harbor
World War II spies for Germany